Camillo Baldi (died 1650) was a Roman Catholic prelate who served as Bishop of Nicotera (1645–1650).

Biography
On 6 March 1645, Camillo Baldi was appointed during the papacy of Pope Innocent X as Bishop of Nicotera. On 19 March 1645, he was consecrated bishop by Giulio Cesare Sacchetti, Cardinal-Priest of Santa Susanna, with Onorato Onorati, Bishop of Urbania e Sant'Angelo in Vado, and Papirio Silvestri, Bishop of Macerata e Tolentino, serving as co-consecrators. 
He served as Bishop of Nicotera until his death in 1650.

References 

17th-century Italian Roman Catholic bishops
Bishops appointed by Pope Innocent X
1650 deaths